Ibrahim Memon Madani is  an influential imam. who was born in Medina. He moved to England in 1980 where he completed his Hifz ul-Quran and Aalim course. In 1987, he was appointed imam of the mosque in Waterloo, Ontario and in 1991 he moved to Buffalo, New York with his father and brothers to establish the Darul-Uloom Al-Madania. He later established Darul-Uloom Canada in Chatham, Canada.

References

Year of birth missing (living people)
Living people
People from Medina
Saudi Arabian imams
Saudi Arabian Sunni Muslim scholars of Islam
Saudi Arabian emigrants to Canada
Saudi Arabian emigrants to the United States